Talida Tolnai (born 21 August 1979) is a Romanian female handballer. She participated at the 2008 Summer Olympics in China, where the Romanian team placed seventh.

International honours
EHF Champions League:
Finalist: 2010
Semifinalist: 2009, 2012
EHF Champions Trophy:
Winner: 2007
EHF Cup Winners' Cup:
Winner: 2007
Semifinalist: 2001
City Cup:
Winner: 1996
Semifinalist: 1997
European Championship:
Bronze Medallist: 2010
Fifth Place: 2008
World Championship:
Fourth Place: 2007

References

External links
Profile at European Handball Federation

1979 births
Living people
People from Zalău
Romanian female handball players
Handball players at the 2000 Summer Olympics
Handball players at the 2008 Summer Olympics
Olympic handball players of Romania
SCM Râmnicu Vâlcea (handball) players
Üsküdar Belediyespor players
Expatriate handball players in Turkey
Romanian expatriate sportspeople in Turkey
Romanian expatriate sportspeople in Slovenia